"Black and White" is a song recorded by Australian/American musical duo Kylie and Garibay, for their eponymous second extended play (EP) Kylie and Garibay (2015). The song features vocals of Jamaican musician Shaggy. It was released as the first track from the EP on September 11, 2015. Production of the song was handled by Moroder and Garibay, while it was written by Minogue, Garibay and Whitney Phillips. To promote the EP, Minogue released a music video for "Black and White" on September 11, 2015, which was edited by Benjamin Ricart and directed by Katerina Jebb.

Background
In 2014, it was reported that Minogue was working on an EP with American producer Fernando Garibay, following her departure from Jay Z's management, Roc Nation.

Reception

Critical reception
"Black and White" has received positive reviews from music critics, with Robbie Daw of Idolator commenting, "somehow Kylie has found her old-school dance music mojo again, and we’re all the better for it". Digital Spy whilst expressing surprise at the collaboration, nevertheless remarked, "there's something oddly warming about Shaggy's slightly stilted rap reassuring Kylie: "I need you in my arms, girl"".

Commercial performance
"Black and White" first appeared on the charts in Scotland, debuting at number 72.

Music video
A music video for "Black and White" premiered on Minogue's YouTube channel on September 11, 2015. The video was directed by Katerina Jebb. Robbie Daw from Idolator likened the visual as reminiscent of the Hollywood golden era, "looking like a silver screen goddess from Hollywood’s golden age in a little two-piece number, shaking her flawless body around in a wedding veil and showing off her hula dancing skills." Rebecca Merriman for Daily Mirror similarly noted, "shot in black and white, with some distortion, the sensual vintage style video echoes old Hollywood and is definitely a departure from her Showgirl days" and went on to note, "there are some stranger moments - like when she hangs off a tree - but it is proper vintage Kylie behaviour".

Track listing

Charts

Release history

References

2015 songs
Black-and-white music videos
Kylie Minogue songs
Song recordings produced by Fernando Garibay
Song recordings produced by Giorgio Moroder
Songs written by Fernando Garibay
Songs written by Kylie Minogue
Songs written by Whitney Phillips